Down Easter or Downeaster may refer to:

 Down Easter (ship), or Downeaster, a type of 19th-century sailing ship
 Downeaster (train), an Amtrak passenger train running from Boston, Massachusetts, to Brunswick, Maine
 Down Easter, someone from Down East, referring to the U.S. state of Maine and Canada's Maritime Provinces
 Down Easter, a summer-only 1927–1950 New Haven Railroad, Boston & Maine Railroad and Maine Central Railroad passenger train that ran from New York to Halifax, Nova Scotia in early years; in late 1930s–1950, New York to Rockland, Maine.
 Downeaster, or Bay Breeze, a cocktail drink

See also
Down East (disambiguation)
"The Downeaster Alexa", a song by Billy Joel